Axel Gunerius Pettersen (28 September 1925 – 18 February 2021) was a Norwegian businessperson and politician for the Conservative Party.

He was a brother of Gunerius Pettersen and grandson of merchant Axel Pettersen, who owned the company Gunerius Pettersen A/S (now: Gunerius Shoppingsenter). Axel owned the company, which was founded by Gunerius Pettersen (1826–1892), together with Harald, Gunerius and Carl Pettersen who were all Axel G. Pettersen's granduncles. A fourth granduncle was Hjalmar Pettersen, the noted a librarian and bibliographer.

Axel's older brother inherited the family company in 1947, and after a few years Axel G. Pettersen replaced Christian Børs Pettersen as co-owner. In their time, the family company was expanded from operating a shopping centre to additional ownerships, such as the chain Bonus. Axel G. Pettersen was the chairman of Bonus Invest for many years.

Pettersen was a member of Oslo city council for eight years, and was a member of the financial committee of the Norwegian Olympic Committee. He was a deputy chair of the employers' association Norges Tekstilkjøpmenns Forbund.

He died on 18 February 2021, at the age of 95.

References

1925 births
2021 deaths
Businesspeople from Oslo
Conservative Party (Norway) politicians
Norwegian businesspeople in retailing
Politicians from Oslo